Nogbon or the Ossetian New Year is a new year festival celebrated by Ossetians and the "master of the New Year" in Ossetian mythology. It is celebrated annually between 12–14 of January.

The common customs/rituals of the festival are serving a traditional festive pie called "artkhuron" which symbolizes the sun, dancing around the fire and jumping over the fire to eliminate "last year's adversity".

References

External links 
 Ossetians - Ossetian holidays and celebrations
 Sticky Porridge, Grandma's Beer, Country-Style Capers

New Year celebrations
January observances
Ossetian culture
Indigenous peoples days